The Adameys or Adamians were a Circassian tribe who were massacred in the Circassian genocide. Today, they are assimilated into the Chemguy tribe and reduced to a small family in the village of Adamy.

History 
The Adameys were first mentioned in 1667 in the reports of the Turkish traveler Evliya Çelebi, who reported: 

According to Evliya Çelebi's report, this is how the tribe adopted its name:

Semyon Mikhailovich Bronevsky wrote in his 1823 description:
The majority of Ademeys were destroyed in the Circassian genocide. The survivors were first exiled to the Balkans in 1864 (see Circassians in Bulgaria), and later settled in Turkey where they assimilated into other tribes or Turks.

Notable personalities 

 Sultan Khan-Giray

References 

Circassian tribes
History of Kuban
Ethnic groups in Russia
Adygea
Historical ethnic groups of Russia